Negative pulldown is the manner in which an image is exposed on a film stock, described in the number of film perforations spanned by an individual frame. It can also describe the orientation of the image on the negative, whether it is captured horizontally or vertically.  Changing the number of exposed perforations allows a cinematographer to change both the aspect ratio of the image and the size of the area on the film stock that the image occupies (which affects image clarity).

The most common negative pulldowns for 35 mm film are 4-perf and 3-perf, the latter of which is usually used in conjunction with Super 35. 2-perf, used in Techniscope in the 1960s, is enjoying a slight resurgence due to the birth of digital intermediate techniques eliminating the need for optical lab work. Vertical pulldown is overwhelmingly the dominant axis of motion in cinematography, although horizontal pulldown is used in IMAX, VistaVision (still in use for some visual effects work), and in 35 mm consumer and professional still cameras.

Usage of various formats

History 
Most 35 mm film systems, whether they are cameras, telecine equipment, optical printers or projectors, are configured to accommodate the 4-perf system, where each frame of 35 mm is 4 perforations long. 4-perf was (and remains) the traditional system, and virtually all projectors are based on 4-perf, because 4 perforations is the amount needed per frame vertically in order to have enough negative space for a roughly squarish image, which became the silent film standard aspect ratio of 1.33:1. 

Later, when the film industry was facing the perceived threat of obsolescence to television, which also was universally a 1.33:1 aspect ratio at the time (and remained so in many countries until the introduction of DTV), studios started experimenting with various competing widescreen formats.

Current practice 
Eventually, aspect ratios of 1.85:1 in North America and 1.66:1 in Europe became standard for 35 mm productions shot with normal non-anamorphic lenses. However, the way the aspect ratio is created with these films is not in-camera, but rather by placing a cropping device, known as an aperture mask, over the film in the projector. What this means is that most films are shot in full screen format (often incorrectly referred to as 1.33:1 but actually 1.37:1 because of the sound tracks), but composed for 1.85:1 or 1.66:1 and cropped that way in projection. Therefore, a fair percentage of the film is wasted, because the cropped top and bottom are usually never meant to be shown, unless it was well protected for Full Screen presentation.
3-perf and 2-perf are only used in the origination and post-production transfer process.

35 mm

2-perf

2-perf camera systems use only 2 perforations per frame on 35 mm film, which gives an aspect ratio close to the 2.39:1 aspect ratio used in anamorphic prints. It was first proposed conceptually around 1930, but was not put into practice until 1961, when Techniscope was developed at Technicolor's Italian branch. It has recently been brought up again with the advent of higher quality, lower grain film stocks as well as digital intermediate post-production methods which eliminate optical blowups and thus improve quality. While in the recent past, some companies have offered custom conversions of camera equipment to 2-perf, it appears that camera manufacturers are now poised to support the format. Arri made 2-perf movement blocks for their Arricam and Arriflex 235 cameras available for rental in March 2007, while Aaton's Penelope camera, released in October 2008, was the first camera specifically designed for 2-perf usage (as well as 3-perf).

3-perf

In the early 1980s, Swedish cinematographer Rune Ericson collaborated with Panavision on the concept of creating a 3-perf mechanism for motion picture cameras. 3-perf minimized the problem of wasted film by changing the camera gate and shutter mechanism so that each frame is 3 perforations high instead of the standard 4-perforations. The 3-perf image's aspect ratio is roughly 1.78:1, which makes it both ideal for widescreen television and very close to 1.85:1 without losing any image outside this area to waste. Because of the smaller frame, the camera effectively runs 25% slower, yielding 25% savings on film stock; the camera will run more quietly because less film is moved through the camera per frame; and the Super 35 variant allows for a larger negative area, which can help compensate for increased grain when using higher-speed film stocks.

In the late 1990s, noted cinematographer Vittorio Storaro proposed a film standard known as Univisium (also called Univision), which advocates 3-perf Super 35 to create a 2.00:1 aspect ratio.

Disadvantages of 3-perf and 2-perf 
The only disadvantage of 3-perf and 2-perf is that if it is to be projected theatrically, it needs to be transferred back to a 4-perf system, which typically means a film print with black cropping on the print itself in order to fit the image onto a 4-perf frame – the same wastage problem as before.  Even so, the amount of film shot on a production is much greater than the length of the final film, so 3-perf or 2-perf are still viable cost-saving options for production.  Generally, 3-perf is most frequently used for widescreen television productions shot on film, because the film will be developed and then permanently transferred to video, rendering projection incompatibilities irrelevant.  Recently, this process has become popular with big-budget motion picture production, due to the advent of the digital intermediate process.  The negative is scanned to high resolution (usually HD, 2K or 4K (digital cinema)) digital files, colour graded, and ultimately printed back to standard 4-perf for projection.  At some point in the future, the final 4-perf print will become unnecessary assuming the cinema distribution and projection chain become fully digital.

3-perf and 2-perf pose minor problems for visual effects work.  The area of the film in 4-perf work that is not projected nonetheless contains picture information which is useful for such visual effects tasks as 2D and 3D tracking.  This mildly complicates certain visual effects efforts for productions using 3-perf and 2-perf.

VistaVision 

VistaVision is a higher resolution, widescreen variant of the 35 mm motion picture film format which was created by engineers at Paramount Pictures in 1954. It uses a horizontal, 8 perforation 35 mm image, similar to that used in 135 film for still photography. Paramount did not use anamorphic processes such as CinemaScope but refined the quality of their flat widescreen system by orienting the 35 mm negative horizontally in the camera gate and shooting onto a larger area, which yielded a finer-grained projection print.

70 mm

Standard 65 mm (5/70) (Todd-AO, Super Panavision)
 spherical lenses
 5 perforations/frame
 42 frames/meter (12.8 frame/ft)
 34.29 meters/minute (112.5 ft/minute)
 vertical pulldown
 24 frames/second
 camera aperture: 52.48 by 23.01 mm (2.066 by 0.906 in)
 projection aperture: 48.56 by 20.73 mm (1.912 by  0.816 in)
 305 m (1000 feet), about 9 minutes at 24 frame/s = 4.5 kg (10 pounds) in can
 aspect ratio: 2.2:1

Ultra Panavision 70 (MGM Camera 65)

Same as Standard 65 mm except
 Shot with special anamorphic adapter in front of lens
 1.25× squeeze factor, projected aspect ratio 2.76:1

Showscan

Same as Standard 65 mm except
 60 frames per second

IMAX (15/70)

 spherical lenses
 15 perforations per frame
 horizontal movement, from right to left (viewed from base side)
 24 frames per second
 camera aperture: 70.41 by 52.63 mm (2.772 by 2.072 in)
 projection aperture: at least 2 mm (0.080 in) less than camera aperture on the vertical axis and at least 0.4 mm (0.016 in) less on the horizontal axis
 aspect ratio: 1.35:1 (camera), 1.43:1 (projected)

Dynavision (8/70) (Also known as Iwerks 8/70)
 fisheye or spherical lenses, depending on if projecting for a dome or not
 vertical pulldown
 24 or 30 frames per second
 camera aperture: 52.83 by 37.59 mm (2.080 by 1.480 in)

See also
 List of film formats

References

 https://web.archive.org/web/20080118094257/http://www.arri.de/prod/cam/technology_3_perforation.htm
 https://web.archive.org/web/20060713061542/http://www.aaton.com/products/film/35/3perf.php

External links
 Movie Making Manual wikibook article on Telecine including a list of facilities that can telecine 2-perf

Film and video technology